Đuro Daničić (4 April 1825 – 17 November 1882), born Đorđe Popović and also known as Đura Daničić, was a Serbian philologist, translator, linguistic historian and lexicographer. He was a prolific scholar at the Belgrade Lyceum.

Biography 
He was born in Novi Sad, in the family of Orthodox priest Jovan Popović. He attended schools in Novi Sad and Bratislava, and studied law at the University of Vienna. He published his first papers under the name Đuro Daničić in 1845, after the heroic Senj Uskok from a folk poem, and a name that he continued to use throughout the rest of his life. Under the influence of Vuk Karadžić and Franz Miklosich, he started studying Slavic philology, to which he subsequently devoted his entire career. In 1856, he became the librarian of the People's Library in Belgrade and secretary of the Society of Serbian Literacy, and, in 1859, professor of the Belgrade Lyceum (Velika škola). In 1866 he was invited to Zagreb to serve as a secretary general of the Yugoslav Academy of Sciences and Arts (JAZU). He served as a secretary general on two occasions between 1866-1873 and 1877-1882. From 1873 he taught as a professor at Belgrade's Grandes écoles (former Belgrade Lyceum and future University of Belgrade), and in 1877 he returned to Zagreb where he played a key role in preparing the Academy's Dictionary, "Croatian or Serbian Dictionary of JAZU". He was the editor of the first volume (A–Češula) that was published from 1880 to 1882. His death in 1882, in Zagreb, interrupted that work and he was buried in Marko's cemetery in Belgrade.

Works 

Daničić played a key role of laying the foundation of Serbian philology, grammar, historical dictionary and dialectology on the basis of principles set by Vuk Karadžić. His translation of the Old Testament, mostly from German sources, also influenced Croatian translation literature. Daničić also assisted Karadžić in his translation of the New Testament into Serbian in 1847. After undergoing a revision, both translations were accepted and are still in use today by the Serbian Orthodox Church and its members.

In 1847, he published a well-known polemical essay "The War for Serbian Language and Orthography", where he opposed linguistic ideas of Miloš Svetić, the pseudonymous Jovan Hadžić, Karadžić's main opponent, and supported Karadžić's phonemic orthography. He gave the theoretical background to Karadžić's concepts in his numerous linguistic works.

Daničić also studied the older Serbian literature and his redactions of old manuscripts are still in use, like Theodossus' Hagiography of Saint Sava (1860), Domentian's Hagiographies of Saint Simeon and Saint Sava (1865), Gospel of St. Nicholas (1864), Lives of Kings and Archbishops Serbian (1866) and numerous others.

Daničić started scientific work as supporter of Karadžić's ideas of linguistic pan-Serbism (attribution of Shtokavian dialect and written heritage to Serbian ethnos). His early works were ostensibly devoted to "Serbs of Catholic faith", for which he was criticized by young Vatroslav Jagić. In 1857, he published "Differences between Languages Serbian and Croatian" (written using the old orthography) where he identified Croatian with the Chakavian dialect. However, his attitudes evaluated towards promotion of pan-Yugoslavian ideology, much closer to the viewpoints of Illyrian movement, with which he was closely cooperating. That included linguistic unity of Croats and Serbs and the opinion that the Croatian literature is at the same time Serbian and vice versa. His linguistic papers were titled using "Croatian or Serbian" qualifier when he published in Zagreb, and "Serbian or Croatian" when published in Belgrade.

Legacy

He is included in The 100 most prominent Serbs.

Selected works 
 Little Serbian Grammar (1850)
 Serbian Syntax (1858)
 Morphemes in Serbian or Croatian Language (1872)
 History of Morphemes in Serbian or Croatian Language (1874)
 Basics of Serbian or Croatian Language (1876)
 Roots in Croatian or Serbian Language (1877)
 Croatian or Serbian Dictionary, Volume 1 (A-češula) (1880–1882)
 Serbian accents (1925)

See also
 Vienna Literary Agreement
 Dimitrije Nešić

References

Sources
 Jovan Skerlić Istorija nove srpske književnosti (Belgrade, 1921) pages 255-271
 Serbian Academy of Sciences and Arts: http://www.sanu.ac.rs/English/Clanstvo/IstClan.aspx?arg=130
  (old Serbian)
  (old Serbian)

External links

 

Linguists from Serbia
Linguists from Croatia
Translators of the Bible into Serbian
Eastern Orthodox Christians from Serbia
Members of the Croatian Academy of Sciences and Arts
Writers from Novi Sad
1825 births
1882 deaths
University of Vienna alumni
Academic staff of Belgrade Higher School
19th-century translators
Academic staff of the Lyceum of the Principality of Serbia